Patrícia Pereira dos Santos (born 11 December 1977) is a Brazilian Paralympic swimmer who competes in international events.

Career
She represented Brazil at the 2020 Summer Paralympics and won a bronze medal in the Mixed 4 × 50 metre freestyle relay 20pts.

Personal life
In 2002, she was shot in the neck during a robbery at her workplace. Her injuries resulted in quadriplegia.

References 

1977 births
Living people
Brazilian female freestyle swimmers
Paralympic swimmers of Brazil
Swimmers at the 2016 Summer Paralympics
Swimmers at the 2020 Summer Paralympics
Medalists at the 2020 Summer Paralympics
Medalists at the World Para Swimming Championships
Paralympic medalists in swimming
Paralympic bronze medalists for Brazil
Brazilian female breaststroke swimmers
S4-classified Paralympic swimmers
Brazilian people with disabilities
21st-century Brazilian women